The Gideon Pelton Farm is a Registered Historic Place located on Rockafellow Lane in the Town of Montgomery in Orange County, New York.  Pelton settled the area in the 1770s and built the house soon afterwards. A stone wing was built on it before the end of the century, and in the 1830s a large frame section was added in the then-popular Greek Revival style that gave the house its current character. It continues to be used as a farmhouse to this day.

It was added to the National Register of Historic Places in 1995.

References

Houses on the National Register of Historic Places in New York (state)
Greek Revival houses in New York (state)
Houses completed in 1770
Houses in Orange County, New York
National Register of Historic Places in Orange County, New York
1770 establishments in the Province of New York